Joshua Samuel Donn (born June 1, 1982 in Knoxville, Tennessee) is a multi national champion and a gold medal world junior champion in contract bridge. He is known as a bridge lecturer as well as author. He is the all-time leader of Richard Pavlicek's monthly polls that ran from 2000-2006 and had thousands of participants from over 90 countries. He currently resides in Las Vegas, Nevada with his daughter.

Publications
Donn authored a popular online column called "Breakin' the Rules" from 2011 to 2015. He also co-authored a book called More Breaking the Rules: Second Hand Play with Barry Rigal in 2013.

Bridge accomplishments

Awards
 Joan Gerard Youth Award, World Bridge Federation
 Finalist, International Bridge Press Association "Yeh Bros. 2014 Best Bid Deal of the Year" for Josh Donn & Adam Kaplan in "Grand Bidding" by Sue Munday
 Finalist, International Bridge Press Association "2014 Master Point Press Book of the Year" for More Breaking the Rules - Second-Hand Play by Barry Rigal and Josh Donn

Wins
 World Youth Bridge Team Championships 2006
 Roth Open Swiss Teams 2008
 Kaplan Blue Ribbon Pairs 2011
 Roth Open Swiss Teams 2016
 Roth Open Swiss Teams 2019

Runners-up
 NABC+ Mixed Swiss Teams 2016
 Grand National Teams 2016

External links

References

1982 births
American contract bridge players
Living people
People from Knoxville, Tennessee